Kamionka  is a village in the administrative district of Gmina Iława, within Iława County, Warmian-Masurian Voivodeship, in northern Poland.

Kamionka was divided into the villages Klein Steinersdorf and the lake Silm (Silmsee/Jezioro Silm) and Gross Steinersdorf with lake Haus (Haussee/Jezioro Szymbarskie) and was in the district of the city Rosenberg (Susz).

Today Kamionka (Jezioro Silm) is known for the ship handling and research and trainings center (http://www.ilawashiphandling.com.pl). Many people from the town Iława are knowing the region, because they are making their sport around the lake Silm (running, biking, walking). A walk around this lake is about 5,5 km.

References

Villages in Iława County